In My Brother's Shadow: A Life and Death in the SS (German: Am Beispiel meines Bruders) is the title of a semi-autobiographical novel by Uwe Timm. It was translated and published in English in 2005. The plot, based on Timm's own experience living through World War II, tells the story of the protagonist's brother, an SS corporal killed in Russia in 1943.

2003 German novels
German-language novels
Autobiographical novels
Novels set during World War II